Fujimura (written: 藤村 lit. "Japanese wisteria village") is a Japanese surname. Notable people with the surname include:

, Japanese actor and voice actor
, Japanese voice actress
, Japanese baseball player
, Japanese baseball player
, Japanese swimmer
Makoto Fujimura (born 1960), American artist
, Japanese operatic mezzo-soprano
, Japanese singer
, Japanese philosophy student and poet
Osamu Fujimura (scientist) (born 1927), Japanese scientist
, Japanese politician
, Japanese actress
, Japanese amateur archaeologist and hoaxer
, Japanese speed skater
, Japanese actor
, Japanese sport wrestler

Fictional characters
, a character in the visual novel Fate/stay night

Japanese-language surnames